Kulebaki is a town in Nizhny Novgorod Oblast, Russia, located  southwest of Nizhny Novgorod, the administrative center of the oblast. As of the 2010 Census, its population was 35,759.

History
The village of Kulebaki was first mentioned in 1719. Town status was granted to it in 1932.

Administrative and municipal status
Within the framework of administrative divisions, it is, together with two work settlements (Gremyachevo and Veletma) and twenty-eight rural localities, incorporated as the town of oblast significance of Kulebaki—an administrative unit with the status equal to that of the districts. As a municipal division, the town of oblast significance of Kulebaki is incorporated as Kulebaki Urban Okrug.

Until May 2015, the town served as the administrative center of Kulebaksky District and, within the framework of administrative divisions, was incorporated within that district as a town of district significance. As a municipal division, it was incorporated as Kulebaki Urban Settlement within Kulebaksky Municipal District.

Economy
The local metal-working plant, Ruspolymet, founded in 1866 and originally producing equipment for railway industry, is now producing components for aerospace industry as well.

References

Notes

Sources

Cities and towns in Nizhny Novgorod Oblast
Kulebaki Urban Okrug
Ardatovsky Uyezd (Nizhny Novgorod Governorate)